Shir Shotor (also Romanized as Shīr Shotor and Shīr Shutur) is a village in Shusef Rural District, Shusef District, Nehbandan County, South Khorasan Province, Iran. At the 2006 census, its population was 93, in 26 families.

References 

Populated places in Nehbandan County